John Slade (born Hans Schlesinger, May 30, 1908 – September 12, 2005) was an American field hockey player. He competed at the 1948 Summer Olympics. Born in Germany in 1908, Slade emigrated to the United States in 1935. During World War II, Slade served in the United States Army as an interrogator of German prisoners of war, being awarded a Bronze Star Medal for his service.

References

Further reading

External links
 

1908 births
2005 deaths
American financial businesspeople
United States Army personnel of World War II
Jewish emigrants from Nazi Germany to the United States
Olympic field hockey players of the United States
American male field hockey players
Sportspeople from Frankfurt
Field hockey players at the 1948 Summer Olympics
United States Army soldiers
Recipients of the Order of Merit of the Federal Republic of Germany